J. Curtis McKay (October 10, 1926 – March 23, 1998) was an American Republican lawyer and politician from Wisconsin.

Born in Chicago, Illinois, McKay graduated from Grinnell College and received his law degree from Northwestern University School of Law. He practiced law in Ozaukee County, Wisconsin and served in the Wisconsin State Assembly 1961–1967.

Notes

Lawyers from Chicago
People from Ozaukee County, Wisconsin
Grinnell College alumni
Northwestern University Pritzker School of Law alumni
Wisconsin lawyers
1926 births
1998 deaths
20th-century American lawyers
20th-century American politicians
Republican Party members of the Wisconsin State Assembly